A falling-sand game is a genre of video game and subgenre of sandbox games using a two-dimensional particle game engine or a cellular automaton.

In falling-sand games, the user can interact with (e.g. place and remove) particles on a canvas which can interact with other particles in various ways, which can lead to complex emergent behaviour. As sandbox games, they generally have an emphasis on free-form gameplay, relaxed rules, and minimal goals.

Despite the name, falling-sand games typically contain a multitude of materials besides sand, often called "elements".

History

The first known popular example in the "falling-sand" genre was a web-based Java applet on the Japanese Dofi-Blog in 2005 which was later expanded and rehosted as the "Falling sand game", which kick-started the genre as a trend and gave it its name.

The genre is not limited to free play canvas-style games; games such as the Powder Game contain additional mechanics, such as pressure based fluid simulation  allowing for example water equalisation, and RPG elements such as controllable characters.

Noita blends the traditional sandbox physics with Roguelike RPG mechanics, with sophisticated playable characters and enemies.

References

Online games
Java platform games
Flash games
Simulation video games
Video game genres
Cellular automata in computer games